Grace  Dieu Manor is a 19th-century country house near Thringstone in Leicestershire, England,  occupied by Grace Dieu Manor School until 2020. It is a Grade II listed building.

Early history
The house is named after the adjacent Grace Dieu Priory,  a priory  founded in 1240 by Roesia de Verdun for fourteen Augustinian nuns and a prioress . It was dissolved  in 1540 and   granted to Sir Humphrey Foster, who immediately conveyed it to John Beaumont (fl. 1550), Master of the Rolls, who made it his residence.

Beaumont
The descent in the Beaumont family was as follows:
John Beaumont (fl. 1550), Master of the Rolls. 
Sir Francis Beaumont (d.1598) (son),  a judge. His second son was the dramatist and poet Francis Beaumont, most famous for his collaborations with John Fletcher.
Sir John Beaumont, 1st Baronet (c.1582/3 – April 1627) (eldest son), created the first of the Beaumont baronets of Grace Dieu in 1627.
Sir John Beaumont, 2nd Baronet (1607–1643)
Sir Thomas Beaumont, 3rd Baronet (1620–1686), after whose death the estate was sold to Sir Ambrose Phillips (1637–1691)

Phillips
Sir Ambrose Phillips (1637–1691) purchased the estate following the death of the 3rd and last Beaumont baronet in 1686.  Phillips demolished most of the priory church in 1696. On the death of his eventual successor in 1796 the estate passed to his cousin Thomas March, who adopted the surname Phillips in lieu of his patronymic.

Present building
In 1833,  Charles March Phillips gave the manor of Grace Dieu to his son, Ambrose Lisle March Phillips, following his marriage.   Ambrose had converted to Roman Catholicism at an early age, and was an enthusiast for monasticism. His biographer Edmund Sheridan  Purcell says his father  had been  "anxious to see him married and settled lest his religious fervour should induce him to make vows of celibacy, which he often spoke of as the highest life, and follow up by entering the cloister or ranks of the secular clergy" The old priory buildings having fallen into ruins, he set about  building a new house to a  design in a "Tudor" style  by the London architect  William Railton.  It was built on higher ground, about 300 yards south of the priory ruins. There was  a chapel attached, later enlarged by A.W.N. Pugin. 

Between the chapel and the cross was a series of fourteen shrines, each containing a representation of a scene  from Christ's passion. At the foot of the rock he built a village school, dedicated to St Aloysius. Sir Banister Fletcher made  alterations in around 1900.

The manor was rented by Charles Booth and family from 1886 to the death of Mary Booth in 1939. Charles died there in 1916 at the age of 76. Mary oversaw much of the restoration work on the building in the early years of their stay.

The March Phillips family, later March Phillips de Lisle, owned the house until 1933, although their main residence was at the Hall they built at the former Garendon Abbey. Following the death of two of its heads in quick succession, the family needed to tighten its belt and so in 1885 moved out of Garendon and into Grace Dieu Manor. A return to fortune allowed the family to return to Garendon once more in 1907, however. Finally in 1964 Garendon Hall was demolished and the family returned to Grace Dieu for a final time, selling the house within a decade. Grace Dieu Manor then became a Catholic school. The school was part of the educational trust of the Rosminian order.

In 1972 the family moved to  Quenby Hall, but following the collapse of the family cheese making business, the family offered the Hall for sale.

Notes

References

:

Grade II listed buildings in Leicestershire
History of Leicestershire
Country houses in Leicestershire
Grade II listed houses